Nemecká is a village and municipality in Brezno District, in the Banská Bystrica Region of central Slovakia. The name, which can be translated as "German village", suggests villagers, or part of them, being of German origin.

The first written mention of the village is from 1281. The villagers were mostly farmers and forest workers. Later, basic industries like limeworks, brickworks etc. developed in the area. From the 18th century on, many locals took part in door-to-door selling of laces, manufacturing of which also took place in the village.

The village was a site of German atrocities during World War II aimed to suppress Slovak National Uprising. As many as 900 people were executed and their bodies burned in local lime kiln. The killings took 7 days (January 4–11, 1945). Responsible for the killings were members of German Einsatzkommando 14 led by Obersturmfuhrer Kurt Herbert Deffner and members of Slovak regime's Hlinka Guard led by captain Vojtech Kosovsky. The victims were participants of the uprising, their families and people from "proscribed races", i.e. Roma and Jews. 

A monument commemorating the massacre was built after World War II with a small exhibition opened to visitors all year long.

References

External links
Slovak article about WWII incident in Nemecká

Villages and municipalities in Brezno District